Eudora is a census-designated place and unincorporated community located in southwestern DeSoto County, Mississippi, United States, approximately  south of Memphis, Tennessee. The intersection of Mississippi Highway 301 and old Mississippi Highway 304 has been the traditional heart of Eudora for decades.

The community has seen little growth in its history, unlike many other areas of Desoto County which have experienced tremendous development due to suburban sprawl from Memphis. The limited growth Eudora has seen, mostly new homes, likely results from its proximity to the casino district at Robinsonville,  to the west. Also spurring interest in the area is the 2007 opening of the I-69 freeway which makes commuting to Memphis easier. Eudora is served by this new route with exits at Fogg Road and MS Hwy 301.

It was first named as a CDP in the 2020 Census which listed a population of 386.

Demographics

2020 census

Note: the US Census treats Hispanic/Latino as an ethnic category. This table excludes Latinos from the racial categories and assigns them to a separate category. Hispanics/Latinos can be of any race.

Attractions 
Camp Currier: A  campground owned and operated by the Chickasaw Council of the Boy Scouts of America, serving scouts from all over the Memphis region.
Arkabutla Lake: An  reservoir built and managed by the U.S. Army Corps of Engineers. Popular with local fisherman, boaters and campers.
Tunica Resorts (Robinsonville): The third-largest casino district in the nation.

References

External links 

 http://www.mvk.usace.army.mil/Missions/Recreation/Arkabutla-Lake/Arkabutla-Lake-Recreation/
 http://www.campcurrier.org/

Unincorporated communities in DeSoto County, Mississippi
Unincorporated communities in Mississippi
Memphis metropolitan area
Census-designated places in DeSoto County, Mississippi